The 2017 America East Conference baseball tournament was held from May 24 to 27, 2017. All six eligible participants out of the league's seven teams met in the double-elimination tournament held at Edward A. LeLacheur Park in Lowell, Massachusetts, the home park of UMass Lowell and the minor league Lowell Spinners. UMBC won the tournament and received the conference's automatic bid into the 2017 NCAA Division I baseball tournament.

Seeding and format
All six eligible participants from the regular season were seeded one through six based on conference winning percentage only. The No. 1 and No. 2 seeds received a first-round bye. The teams then played a double-elimination tournament. UMass Lowell, despite hosting the event, was not eligible to participate as it was transitioning from Division II.  The River Hawks are expected to complete this transition and be eligible for championships in the 2017–18 academic year.

Bracket

References

America East Conference Baseball Tournament
Tournament
American East Conference baseball tournament
America East Conference baseball tournament
Baseball competitions in Lowell, Massachusetts
College baseball tournaments in Massachusetts